Alexander III (10 March 18451 November 1894) was Emperor of Russia, King of Congress Poland and Grand Duke of Finland from 13 March 1881 until his death in 1894. He was highly reactionary and reversed some of the liberal reforms of his father, Alexander II. This policy is known in Russia as "counter-reforms". Under the influence of Konstantin Pobedonostsev (1827–1907), he opposed any reform that limited his autocratic rule. During his reign, Russia fought no major wars; he was therefore came to be known as the "The Peacemaker".

Outside of politics, Alexander was additionally known for a striking appearance, with an American historian later noting how he stood out as being a "tall, heavy-set man, of enormous muscular strength." Alexander's major foreign policy achievement was helping forge the Russo-French Alliance and thus directing a major shift in the international relations of Russian society. His political legacy represented a direct challenge to the European cultural order set forth by German statesman Otto von Bismarck, intermingling Russian influences with the shifting balances of power.

Personality

Grand Duke Alexander Alexandrovich was born on 10 March 1845 at the Winter Palace in Saint Petersburg, Russian Empire, the second son and third child of Tsesarevich Alexander (Future Alexander II) and his first wife Maria Alexandrovna (née Princess Marie of Hesse). He was born during the reign of his grandfather Nicholas I.

In disposition, Alexander bore little resemblance to his soft-hearted, liberal father, and still less to his refined, philosophic, sentimental, chivalrous, yet cunning great-uncle Emperor Alexander I. Although an enthusiastic amateur musician and patron of the ballet, Alexander was seen as lacking refinement and elegance. Indeed, he rather relished the idea of being of the same rough texture as some of his subjects. His straightforward, abrupt manner savoured sometimes of gruffness, while his direct, unadorned method of expressing himself harmonized well with his rough-hewn, immobile features and somewhat sluggish movements. His education was not such as to soften these peculiarities.

Alexander was extremely strong. He tore packs of cards in half with his bare hands to entertain his children. When the Austrian ambassador in St. Petersburg said that Austria would mobilize two or three army corps against Russia, he twisted a silver fork into a knot and threw it onto the plate of the ambassador. He said, "That is what I am going to do to your two or three army corps."

Unlike his extroverted wife, Alexander disliked social functions and avoided St. Petersburg. At palace balls, he was impatient for the events to end. He would order each musician of the orchestra to leave and turn off the lights until the guests left.

Alexander was afraid of horses. In his childhood, he had had an unpleasant experience on a bad-tempered mount. His wife once convinced him to go on a carriage ride with her. As he reluctantly entered the carriage, the ponies reared back. He immediately left the carriage and no amount of pleading from his wife could convince him to get back in.

An account from the memoirs of the artist Alexander Benois gives one impression of Alexander III:

After a performance of the ballet Tsar Kandavl at the Mariinsky Theatre, I first caught sight of the Emperor. I was struck by the size of the man, and although cumbersome and heavy, he was still a mighty figure. There was indeed something of the muzhik [Russian peasant] about him. The look of his bright eyes made quite an impression on me. As he passed where I was standing, he raised his head for a second, and to this day I can remember what I felt as our eyes met. It was a look as cold as steel, in which there was something threatening, even frightening, and it struck me like a blow. The Tsar's gaze! The look of a man who stood above all others, but who carried a monstrous burden and who every minute had to fear for his life and the lives of those closest to him. In later years I came into contact with the Emperor on several occasions, and I felt not the slightest bit timid. In more ordinary cases Tsar Alexander III could be at once kind, simple, and even almost homely.

Early life
Though he was destined to be a strongly counter-reforming emperor, Alexander had little prospect of succeeding to the throne during the first two decades of his life, as he had an elder brother, Nicholas, who seemed of robust constitution. Even when Nicholas first displayed symptoms of delicate health, the notion that he might die young was never taken seriously, and he was betrothed to Princess Dagmar of Denmark, daughter of King Christian IX of Denmark and Queen-consort Louise of Denmark, and whose siblings included King Frederick VIII of Denmark, Queen-consort Alexandra of the United Kingdom and King George I of Greece. Great solicitude was devoted to the education of Nicholas as tsesarevich, whereas Alexander received only the training of an ordinary Grand Duke of that period. This included acquaintance with French, English and German, and military drill.

As Tsarevich

Alexander became tsesarevich upon Nicholas's sudden death in 1865. He had been very close to his older brother, and he was devastated by Nicholas' death. When he became tsar, he reflected that “no one had such an impact on my life as my dear brother and friend Nixa [Nicholas]" and lamented that "a terrible responsibility fell on my shoulders" when Nicholas died.

As tsesarevich, Alexander began to study the principles of law and administration under Konstantin Pobedonostsev, then a professor of civil law at Moscow State University and later (from 1880) chief procurator of the Holy Synod of the Orthodox Church in Russia. Pobedonostsev instilled into the young man's mind the belief that zeal for Russian Orthodox thought was an essential factor of Russian patriotism to be cultivated by every right-minded emperor. While he was heir apparent from 1865 to 1881 Alexander did not play a prominent part in public affairs, but allowed it to become known that he had ideas which did not coincide with the principles of the existing government.

On his deathbed, Nicholas allegedly expressed the wish that his fiancée, Princess Dagmar of Denmark, should marry Alexander. Alexander's parents encouraged the match. On 2 June 1866, Alexander went to Copenhagen to visit Dagmar. When they were looking at photographs of the deceased Nicholas, Alexander proposed to Dagmar. On  in the Grand Church of the Winter Palace in St. Petersburg, Alexander wed Dagmar, who converted to Orthodox Christianity and took the name Maria Feodorovna. The union proved a happy one to the end; unlike nearly all of his predecessors since Peter I, there was no adultery in his marriage. The couple spent their wedding night at the Tsarevich's private dacha known as "My Property".

Alexander and his father became estranged due to their different political views. In 1870, Alexander II supported Prussia in the Franco-Prussian War, which angered the younger Alexander. Influenced by his Danish wife Dagmar, Alexander criticized the "shortsighted government" for helping the "Prussian pigs".

Alexander resented his father for having a long-standing relationship with Catherine Dolgorukov (with whom he had several illegitimate children) while his mother, the Empress, was suffering from chronic ill-health. Two days after Empress Marie died, his father told him, “I shall live as I wish, and my union with Princess Dolgorukova is definite" but assured him that "your rights will be safeguarded.” Alexander was furious over his father's decision to marry Catherine a month after his mother's death, which he believed “forever ruined all the dear good memories of family life.” His father threatened to disinherit him if he left court out of protest against the marriage. He privately denounced Catherine as "the outsider" and complained that she was "designing and immature". After his father's assassination, he reflected that his father's marriage to Catherine had caused the tragedy: “All the scum burst out and swallowed all that was holy. The guardian angel flew away and everything turned to ashes, finally culminating in the dreadful incomprehensible 1 March."

Reign
On 13 March 1881 (N.S.) Alexander's father, Alexander II, was assassinated by members of the extremist organization Narodnaya Volya. As a result, Alexander ascended to the Russian imperial throne in Nennal. He and Maria Feodorovna were officially crowned and anointed at the Assumption Cathedral in Moscow on 27 May 1883. Alexander's ascension to the throne was followed by an outbreak of anti-Jewish riots.

Alexander III disliked the extravagance of the rest of his family. It was also expensive for the Crown to pay so many grand dukes each year. Each one received an annual salary of 250,000 rubles, and grand duchesses received a dowry of a million when they married. He limited the title of grand duke and duchess to only children and male-line grandchildren of emperors. The rest would bear a princely title and the style of Serene Highness. He also forbade morganatic marriages, as well as those outside of the Orthodoxy.

Domestic policies

On the day of his assassination, Alexander II signed an ukaz setting up consultative commissions to advise the monarch. On ascending to the throne, however, Alexander III took Pobedonostsev's advice and cancelled the policy before its publication. He made it clear that his autocracy would not be limited.

All of Alexander III's internal reforms aimed to reverse the liberalization that had occurred in his father's reign. The new Emperor believed that remaining true to Russian Orthodoxy, Autocracy, and Nationality (the ideology introduced by his grandfather, emperor Nicholas I) would save Russia from revolutionary agitation.

Alexander weakened the power of the zemstvo (elective local administrative bodies) and placed the administration of peasant communes under the supervision of land-owning proprietors appointed by his government, "land captains" (zemskiye nachalniki). These acts weakened the nobility and the peasantry and brought Imperial administration under the Emperor's personal control. In such policies Alexander III followed the advice of Konstantin Pobedonostsev, who retained control of the Church in Russia through his long tenure as Procurator of the Holy Synod (from 1880 to 1905) and who became tutor to Alexander's son and heir, Nicholas. (Pobedonostsev appears as "Toporov" in Tolstoy's novel Resurrection.)  Other conservative advisors included Count D. A. Tolstoy (minister of education, and later of internal affairs) and I. N. Durnovo (D. A. Tolstoy's successor in the latter post). Mikhail Katkov and other journalists supported the emperor in his autocracy.

The Russian famine of 1891–92, which caused 375,000 to 500,000 deaths, and the ensuing cholera epidemic permitted some liberal activity, as the Russian government could not cope with the crisis and had to allow zemstvos to help with relief (among others, Leo Tolstoy helped with relief efforts on his estate and through the British press, and Chekhov directed anti-cholera precautions in several villages).

Alexander had the political goal of Russification, which involved homogenizing the language and religion of Russia's people. He implemented changes such as teaching only the Russian language in Russian schools in Germany, Poland, and Finland. He also patronized Eastern Orthodoxy and destroyed German, Polish, and Swedish cultural and religious institutions.

Alexander was hostile to Jews; his reign witnessed a sharp deterioration in the Jews' economic, social, and political condition. His policy was eagerly implemented by tsarist officials in the "May Laws" of 1882. These laws encouraged open anti-Jewish sentiment and dozens of pogroms across the western part of the empire. As a result, many Jews emigrated to Western Europe and the United States. They banned Jews from inhabiting rural areas and shtetls (even within the Pale of Settlement) and restricted the occupations in which they could engage.

Encouraged by its successful assassination of Alexander II, the Narodnaya Volya movement began planning the murder of Alexander III. The Okhrana uncovered the plot and five of the conspirators, including Aleksandr Ulyanov, the older brother of Vladimir Lenin, were captured and hanged in May 1887.

Foreign policy

The general negative consensus about the tsar's foreign policy follows the conclusions of the British Prime Minister Lord Salisbury in 1885:
It is very difficult to come to any satisfactory conclusion as to the real objects of Russian policy. I am more inclined to believe there are none; that the Emperor is really his own Minister, and so bad a Minister that no consequent or coherent policy is pursued; but that each influential person, military or civil, snatches from him as opportunity offers the decisions which such person at the moment wants and that the mutual effect of these decisions on each other is determined almost exclusively by chance.

In foreign affairs Alexander III was a man of peace, but not at any price, and held that the best means of averting war is to be well-prepared for it. Diplomat Nikolay Girs, scion of a rich and powerful family, served as his Foreign Minister from 1882 to 1895 and established the peaceful policies for which Alexander has been given credit.  Girs was an architect of the Franco-Russian Alliance of 1891, which was later expanded into the Triple Entente with the addition of Great Britain. That alliance brought France out of diplomatic isolation, and moved Russia from the German orbit to a coalition with France, one that was strongly supported by French financial assistance to Russia's economic modernisation. Girs was in charge of a diplomacy that featured numerous negotiated settlements, treaties and conventions. These agreements defined Russian boundaries and restored equilibrium to dangerously unstable situations. The most dramatic success came in 1885, settling long-standing tensions with Great Britain, which was fearful that Russian expansion to the south would be a threat to India. Girs was usually successful in restraining the aggressive inclinations of Tsar Alexander convincing him that the very survival of the Tsarist system depended on avoiding major wars. With a deep insight into the tsar's moods and views, Girs was usually able to shape the final decisions by outmaneuvering hostile journalists, ministers, and even the Tsarina, as well as his own ambassadors. 

Though Alexander was indignant at the conduct of German chancellor Otto von Bismarck towards Russia, he avoided an open rupture with Germany—even reviving the League of Three Emperors for a period of time and in 1887, signed the Reinsurance Treaty with the Germans. However, in 1890, the expiration of the treaty coincided with the dismissal of Bismarck by the new German emperor, Kaiser Wilhelm II (for whom the Tsar had an immense dislike), and the unwillingness of Wilhelm II's government to renew the treaty. In response Alexander III then began cordial relations with France, eventually entering into an alliance with the French in 1892.

Despite chilly relations with Berlin, the Tsar nevertheless confined himself to keeping a large number of troops near the German frontier. With regard to Bulgaria he exercised similar self-control. The efforts of Prince Alexander and afterwards of Stambolov to destroy Russian influence in the principality roused his indignation, but he vetoed all proposals to intervene by force of arms.

In Central Asian affairs he followed the traditional policy of gradually extending Russian domination without provoking conflict with the United Kingdom (see Panjdeh incident), and he never allowed the bellicose partisans of a forward policy to get out of hand. His reign cannot be regarded as an eventful period of Russian history; but under his hard rule the country made considerable progress.

Alexander and his wife regularly spent their summers at Langinkoski manor along the Kymi River near Kotka on the Finnish coast, where their children were immersed in a Scandinavian lifestyle of relative modesty.

Alexander rejected foreign influence, German influence in particular, thus the adoption of local national principles was deprecated in all spheres of official activity, with a view to realizing his ideal of a Russia homogeneous in language, administration and religion. These ideas conflicted with those of his father, who had German sympathies despite being a patriot; Alexander II often used the German language in his private relations, occasionally ridiculed the Slavophiles and based his foreign policy on the Prussian alliance.

Some differences between father and son had first appeared during the Franco-Prussian War, when Alexander II supported the cabinet of Berlin while the Tsesarevich made no effort to conceal his sympathies for the French.  These sentiments would resurface during 1875–1879, when the Eastern question excited Russian society. At first, the Tsesarevich was more Slavophile than the Russian government. However, his phlegmatic nature restrained him from many exaggerations, and any popular illusions he may have imbibed were dispelled by personal observation in Bulgaria where he commanded the left wing of the invading army. Never consulted on political questions, Alexander confined himself to military duties and fulfilled them in a conscientious and unobtrusive manner. After many mistakes and disappointments, the army reached Constantinople and the Treaty of San Stefano was signed, but much that had been obtained by that important document had to be sacrificed at the Congress of Berlin.

Bismarck failed to do what was expected of him by the Russian emperor. In return for the Russian support which had enabled him to create the German Empire, it was thought that he would help Russia to solve the Eastern question in accordance with Russian interests, but to the surprise and indignation of the cabinet of Saint Petersburg he confined himself to acting the part of "honest broker" at the Congress, and shortly afterwards contracted an alliance with Austria-Hungary for the purpose of counteracting Russian designs in Eastern Europe.

The Tsesarevich could refer to these results as confirmation of the views he had expressed during the Franco-Prussian War; he concluded that for Russia, the best thing was to recover as quickly as possible from her temporary exhaustion, and prepare for future contingencies by military and naval reorganization. In accordance with this conviction, he suggested that certain reforms should be introduced.

Trade and Industry

Alexander III took initiatives to stimulate the development of trade and industry, as his father did before him. Russia's economy was still challenged by the Russian-Turkish war of 1877–1878, which created a deficit, so he imposed customs duties on imported goods. To further alleviate the budget deficit, he implemented increased frugality and accounting in state finances. Industrial development increased during his reign. Also during his reign, construction of the Trans Siberian Railway was started.

Family life 

Following his father's assassination, Alexander III was advised that it would be difficult for him to be kept safe at the Winter Palace. The palace was surrounded by moats, watch towers, and trenches, and soldiers were on guard night and day. Under heavy guard, he would make occasional visits into St. Petersburg, but even then he would stay in the Anichkov Palace, as opposed to the Winter Palace. Alexander resented having to take refuge at Gatchina. Grand Duke Alexander Mikhailovich of Russia remembered hearing Alexander say, “To think that after having faced the guns of the Turks I must retreat now before these skunks."

In the 1860s, Alexander fell in love with his mother's lady-in-waiting, Princess Maria Elimovna Meshcherskaya. Dismayed to learn that Prince Wittgenstein had proposed to her in early 1866, he told his parents that he was prepared to give up his rights of succession in order to marry his beloved "Dusenka". On 19 May 1866, Alexander II informed his son that Russia had come to an agreement with the parents of Princess Dagmar of Denmark, the fiancée of his late elder brother Nicholas. Initially, Alexander refused to travel to Copenhagen because he wanted to marry Maria. Enraged, Alexander II ordered him to go straight to Denmark and propose to Princess Dagmar. Alexander wrote in his diary "Farewell, dear Dusenka."

Despite his initial reluctance, Alexander grew fond of Dagmar. By the end of his life, they loved each other deeply. A few weeks after their wedding, he wrote in his diary: "God grant that... I may love my darling wife more and more... I often feel that I am not worthy of her, but even if this was true, I will do my best to be." When she left his side, he missed her bitterly and complained: "My sweet darling Minny, for five years we've never been apart and Gatchina is empty and sad without you." In 1885, he commissioned Peter Carl Fabergé to produce the first of what were to become a series of jeweled Easter eggs (now called "Fabergé eggs") for her as an Easter gift. Dagmar was so delighted by the First Hen egg that Alexander gave her an egg every year as an Easter tradition. After Alexander died, his heir Nicholas continued the tradition and commissioned two eggs, one for his wife, Empress Alexandra Feodorovna, and one for his mother, Dagmar, every Easter. When she nursed him in his final illness, Alexander told Dagmar, "Even before my death, I have got to known an angel." He died in Dagmar's arms, and his daughter Olga noted that "my mother still held him in her arms" long after he died.

Alexander had six children by Dagmar, five of whom survived into adulthood: Nicholas (b. 1868), George (b. 1871), Xenia (b. 1875), Michael (b. 1878) and Olga (b. 1882). He told Dagmar that "only with [our children] can I relax mentally, enjoy them and rejoice, looking at them." He wrote in his diary that he "was crying like a baby" when Dagmar gave birth to their first child, Nicholas. He was much more lenient with his children than most European monarchs, and he told their tutors, "I do not need porcelain, I want normal healthy Russian children.” General Cherevin believed that the clever George was "the favourite of both parents". Alexander enjoyed a more informal relationship with his youngest son Michael and doted on his youngest daughter, Olga.

Alexander was concerned that his heir-apparent, Nicholas, was too gentle and naive to become an effective Emperor. When Witte suggested that Nicholas participate in the Trans-Siberian Committee, Alexander said, “Have you ever tried to discuss anything of consequence with His Imperial Highness the Grand Duke? His opinions are utterly childish. How could he preside over such a committee?” He was worried that Nicholas had no experiences with women and arranged for the Polish ballerina Mathilde Kschessinskaya to become his son's mistress. Even at the end of his life, he considered Nicholas a child and told him, "I can't imagine you as a fiancé – how strange and unusual!"

Each summer his parents-in-law, King Christian IX and Queen Louise, held family reunions at the Danish royal palaces of Fredensborg and Bernstorff, bringing Alexander, Maria and their children to Denmark. His sister-in-law, the Princess of Wales, would come from Great Britain with some of her children, and his brother-in-law and cousin-in-law, King George I of Greece, his wife, Queen Olga, who was a first cousin of Alexander and a Romanov Grand Duchess by birth, came with their children from Athens. In contrast to the strict security observed in Russia, Alexander and Maria revelled in the relative freedom that they enjoyed in Denmark, Alexander once commenting to the Prince and Princess of Wales near the end of a visit that he envied them being able to return to a happy home in England, while he was returning to his Russian prison. In Denmark, he was able to enjoy joining his children, nephews and nieces, in muddy ponds looking for tadpoles, sneaking into his father-in-law's orchard to steal apples, and playing pranks, such as turning a water hose on the visiting King Oscar II of Sweden.

Alexander had an extremely poor relationship with his brother Grand Duke Vladimir. At a restaurant, Grand Duke Vladimir had a brawl with the French actor Lucien Guitry when the latter kissed his wife, Duchess Marie of Mecklenburg-Schwerin. The prefect of St. Petersburg needed to escort Vladimir out of the restaurant. Alexander was so furious that he temporarily exiled Vladimir and his wife and threatened to exile them permanently to Siberia if they did not leave immediately. When Alexander and his family survived the Borki train disaster in 1888, Alexander joked, "I can imagine how disappointed Vladimir is going to be when he learns that we all stayed alive!" This tension was reflected in the rivalry between Maria Feodorovna and Vladimir's wife, Grand Duchess Marie Pavlovna.

Alexander had better relationships with his other brothers: Alexei (who he made rear admiral and then a grand admiral of the Russian Navy), Sergei (who he made governor of Moscow) and Paul.

Despite the antipathy that Alexander had towards his stepmother, Catherine Dolgorukov, he nevertheless allowed her to remain in the Winter Palace for some time after his father's assassination and to retain various keepsakes of him. These included Alexander II's blood-soaked uniform that he died wearing, and his reading glasses.

Even though he disliked their mother, Alexander was kind to his half-siblings. His youngest half-sister Princess Catherine Alexandrovna Yurievskaya remembered when he would play with her and her siblings: "The Emperor... seemed a playful and kind Goliath among all the romping children."

On  the Imperial train derailed in an accident at Borki. At the moment of the crash, the imperial family was in the dining car. Its roof collapsed, and Alexander held its remains on his shoulders as the children fled outdoors. The onset of Alexander's kidney failure was later attributed to the blunt trauma suffered in this incident.

Illness and death

In 1894, Alexander III became ill with terminal kidney disease (nephritis). His first cousin, Queen Olga of Greece, offered him to stay at her villa Mon Repos, on the island of Corfu, in the hope that it might improve the Tsar's condition. By the time that they reached Crimea, they stayed at the Maly Palace in Livadia, as Alexander was too weak to travel any farther. Recognizing that the Tsar's days were numbered, various imperial relatives began to descend on Livadia. Clergyman John of Kronstadt paid a visit and administered Communion to the Tsar. On 21 October, Alexander received Nicholas's fiancée, Princess Alix of Hesse-Darmstadt, who had come from her native Darmstadt to receive the Tsar's blessing. Despite being exceedingly weak, Alexander insisted on receiving Alix in full dress uniform, an event that left him exhausted. Soon after, his health began to deteriorate more rapidly. After leaving Livadia on 6 November and traveling to St. Petersburg by way of Moscow, his remains were interred on 18 November at the Peter and Paul Fortress, with his funeral being attended by numerous foreign relatives, including King Christian IX of Denmark, the Prince and Princess of Wales, and Duke of York, and Duke and Duchess of Saxe-Coburg-Gotha, and his daughter-in-law to be, Alix of Hesse, and her brother, Grand Duke Ernst Ludwig of Hesse.

Monuments

In 1909, a bronze equestrian statue of Alexander III sculpted by Paolo Troubetzkoy was placed in Znamenskaya Square in front of the Moscow Rail Terminal in St. Petersburg. Both the horse and rider were sculpted in massive form, leading to the nickname of "hippopotamus". Troubetzkoy envisioned the statue as a caricature, jesting that he wished "to portray an animal atop another animal", and it was quite controversial at the time, with many, including the members of the Imperial Family, opposed to the design, but it was approved because the Empress Dowager unexpectedly liked the monument. Following the Revolution of 1917, the statue remained in place as a symbol of tsarist autocracy until 1937 when it was placed in storage. In 1994, it was again put on public display, although in a different place – in front of the Marble Palace. Another pre-revolutionary memorial is located in the city of Irkutsk at the Angara embankment.

For Alexander's role in forging the Franco-Russian Alliance, the French Republic commissioned a bridge named in his honour, Pont Alexandre III. It was opened by his son, Nicholas II, and exists to this day.

On 18 November 2017, Vladimir Putin unveiled a bronze monument to Alexander III on the site of the former Maly Livadia Palace in Crimea. The four-meter monument by Russian sculptor Andrey Kovalchuk depicts Alexander III sitting on a stump, his stretched arms resting on a sabre. An inscription says "Russia has only two allies: the Army and the Navy", although historians dispute whether the Tsar actually said those words. Alexander III is believed to be one of Putin's admired historic leaders, along with Joseph Stalin. On 5 June 2021, he unveiled another monument to Alexander on the site of Gatchina Palace, Leningrad Oblast.

Honours
Domestic
 Knight of St. Andrew, 10 March 1845
 Knight of St. Alexander Nevsky, 10 March 1845
 Knight of St. Anna, 1st Class, 10 March 1845
 Knight of the White Eagle, 10 March 1845
 Knight of St. Vladimir, 4th Class, 1864; 3rd Class, 1870
 Knight of St. Stanislaus, 1st Class, 1865
 Knight of St. George, 2nd Class, 1877

Foreign

Arms

Issue

Alexander III had six children (five of whom survived to adulthood) of his marriage with Princess Dagmar of Denmark, also known as Marie Feodorovna.

(Note: all dates prior to 1918 are in the Old Style Calendar)

Ancestors

See also
 Russian America
 Tsars of Russia family tree
 List of Russian monarchs 
 Emperor of all the Russias 
 President of the Soviet Union

References

Bibliography

 Dorpalen, Andreas. "Tsar Alexander III and the Boulanger Crisis in France." Journal of Modern History 23.2 (1951): 122–136. online
 Etty, John. "Alexander III, Tsar of Russia 1881-1889." History Review 60 (2008): 1–5. online
 Hutchinson, John F. Late Imperial Russia: 1890–1917
 Lincoln, W. Bruce. The Romanovs : autocrats of all the Russias (1981) online free to borrow
 Lowe, Charles.  Alexander III of Russia (1895) online free full-length old biography
 Nelipa, M., ALEXANDER III His Life and Reign (2014), Gilbert's Books
 Polunov, A. Iu. "Konstantin Petrovich Pobedonostsev—Man and Politician". Russian Studies in History 39.4 (2001): 8-32. online, by a leading scholar
Polunov, A. Iu. "The Orthodox Church in the Baltic Region and the Policies of Alexander Ill's Government." Russian Studies in History 39.4 (2001): 66–76. online
 Suny, Ronald Grigor.  "Rehabilitating Tsarism: The Imperial Russian State and Its Historians. A Review Article"  Comparative Studies in Society and History 31#1 (1989) pp. 168–179 online
 Thomson, Oliver. Romanovs: Europe's Most Obsessive Dynasty (2008) ch 13
 Whelan, Heide W. Alexander III & the State Council: bureaucracy & counter-reform in late imperial Russia (Rutgers UP, 1982).

External links

 Alexander III. Historical photos.
 A short biography
 – Historical reconstruction "The Romanovs". StarMedia. Babich-Design(Russia, 2013)

1845 births
1894 deaths
Royalty from Saint Petersburg
People from Sankt-Peterburgsky Uyezd
 
House of Holstein-Gottorp-Romanov
19th-century Russian monarchs
19th-century Polish monarchs
Rulers of Finland
Russian grand dukes
Tsesarevichs of Russia
Eastern Orthodox monarchs
Russification
Children of Alexander II of Russia
Sons of emperors
Russian military personnel of the Russo-Turkish War (1877–1878)

Recipients of the Order of the White Eagle (Russia)
Recipients of the Order of St. Anna, 1st class
Recipients of the Order of St. Vladimir, 3rd class
Recipients of the Order of St. George of the Second Degree
Grand Crosses of the Order of Saint Stephen of Hungary
Recipients of the Order of Bravery, 1st class
Grand Commanders of the Order of the Dannebrog
Recipients of the Cross of Honour of the Order of the Dannebrog
Grand Croix of the Légion d'honneur
Bailiffs Grand Cross of Honour and Devotion of the Sovereign Military Order of Malta
Recipients of the Order of the Netherlands Lion
Knights Grand Cross of the Military Order of William
3
3
3
Grand Crosses of the Order of the Star of Romania
Recipients of the Pour le Mérite (military class)
Knights of the Golden Fleece of Spain
Extra Knights Companion of the Garter
Grand Crosses of the Order of Saint-Charles
Deaths from nephritis
Burials at Saints Peter and Paul Cathedral, Saint Petersburg